The 2022–23 international cricket season is from September 2022 to April 2023. Currently, 27 Tests, 108 One Day Internationals (ODIs) and 107 Twenty20 Internationals (T20Is) are scheduled to be held in this season. In women's international cricket 19 Women's One Day Internationals (WODIs) and 28 Women's Twenty20 Internationals (WT20Is) are scheduled to be held in this season. Additionally, a number of other T20I/WT20I matches are also scheduled to be played in series involving associate nations. The 2022 ICC Men's T20 World Cup, the 2022 Women's Twenty20 Asia Cup, and the 2023 ICC Women's T20 World Cup, all took place during this time.
In the round-robin stage of 2022 Women's Twenty20 Asia Cup, Thailand beat Pakistan by 4 wickets to register their first ever win in international cricket against the opponents.
In July 2022, South Africa withdrew from the three-match ODI series against Australia, after the fixtures clashed with their new domestic T20 league. As a result, Cricket Australia relocated some of its home schedule to include venues that would have hosted the ODI matches. The matches would have formed part of the 2020–2023 ICC Cricket World Cup Super League, with Cricket South Africa and the International Cricket Council (ICC) agreeing to award the points to Australia.

Season overview

Rankings

The following were the rankings at the beginning of the season.

On-going tournaments
The following were the rankings at the beginning of the season.

September

New Zealand in Australia

2022 Papua New Guinea Tri-Nation Series (round 16)

New Zealand women in the West Indies

Australia in India

England in Pakistan

Bangladesh in the UAE

South Africa in India

October

2022 Women's Twenty20 Asia Cup

West Indies in Australia

2022–23 New Zealand Tri-Nation Series

England in Australia

2022 ICC Men's T20 World Cup

Super 12

Finals

November

Ireland women in Pakistan

United Arab Emirates in Nepal

India in New Zealand

2022 Namibia Tri-Nation Series (round 17)

Netherlands women in Thailand

Afghanistan in Sri Lanka

December

2022 Namibia Tri-Nation Series (round 18)

Bangladesh women in New Zealand

2022 Malaysia Cricket World Cup Challenge League A

India in Bangladesh

England women in the West Indies

Australia women in India

South Africa in Australia

In July 2022, South Africa withdrew from the three-match ODI series against Australia, after the fixtures clashed with their new domestic T20 league. The World Cup Super League points for the three matches were awarded to Australia.

New Zealand in Pakistan (December 2022)

January

Sri Lanka in India

Ireland in Zimbabwe

2023 ICC Under-19 Women's T20 World Cup

Pakistan women in Australia

New Zealand in India

2022–23 South Africa women's Tri-Nation Series

England in South Africa

February

West Indies in Zimbabwe

2023 ICC Women's T20 World Cup

Finals

2023 Nepal Tri-Nation Series (round 19)

England in New Zealand

Afghanistan in UAE

Namibia in UAE

2023 United Arab Emirates Tri-Nation Series

West Indies in South Africa

March

England in Bangladesh

Sri Lanka in New Zealand

2023 Nepal Tri-Nation Series (round 21)

Ireland in Bangladesh

Netherlands in Zimbabwe

Afghanistan vs Pakistan in the United Arab Emirates

2023 ICC Cricket World Cup Qualifier play-off

Netherlands in South Africa

April

New Zealand in Pakistan (April 2023)

Ireland in Sri Lanka

See also
 Associate international cricket in 2022–23

Notes

References

2022 in cricket
2023 in cricket
 
Current cricket seasons